Sofiane Attaf (born September 26, 1983 in El Harrach, Algiers Province) is an Algerian football player who is currently playing for Jendouba Sport in the Tunisian league.

Club career
 2005-2007 USM El Harrach 
 2007-2007 USM Alger 
 2007-2008 EGS Gafsa 
 2008-pres. Jendouba Sport

References

1983 births
Living people
People from El Harrach
Algerian footballers
USM Alger players
USM El Harrach players
EGS Gafsa players
Jendouba Sport players
Expatriate footballers in Tunisia
Algerian expatriate sportspeople in Tunisia
Association football forwards
21st-century Algerian people